Isser Harel (1912 – 18 February 2003) was spymaster of the intelligence and the security services of Israel and the Director of the Mossad (1952–1963). In his capacity as Mossad director, he oversaw the capture and covert transportation to Israel of Holocaust organizer Adolf Eichmann.

Biography
Isser Halperin (later Harel) was born in Vitebsk, Russia (now Belarus), to a large, wealthy family. The exact date of his birth was not passed on to him because the book of Gemara in which the date was recorded was lost in the migrations of the Russian Revolution of 1917 and World War I. The family had a vinegar factory in Vitebsk. It was a gift of his maternal grandfather, who had a concession to make vinegar in large parts of Tsarist Russia. Isser was five years old when the revolution broke out and Vitebsk passed several times between the Whites and the Reds. On one occasion he saw Leon Trotsky give a speech in the town.

The Harel family faced hardship when the Soviet regime confiscated their property. In 1922 they emigrated from the Soviet Union to Daugavpils in independent Latvia. On the way, Soviet soldiers stole their suitcases, which contained the rest of their possessions. In Daugavpils, Isser began his formal studies, completed primary school, and began secondary school. As he grew, a Jewish national consciousness grew within him and he joined a Zionist youth organization.

When he was 16, Harel began preparations to emigrate to the British Mandate for Palestine. During this preparatory year he worked in agriculture with the aspiration to join a kibbutz. With the outbreak of the 1929 Hebron massacre, his friends decided to move up their emigration date in order to reinforce the Jewish settlement in Palestine. Documents were prepared for the 17-year-old Harel stating that he was 18 and eligible for a British visa. At the beginning of 1930 he immigrated to Palestine. He crossed Europe from north to south to board a ship in Genoa, carrying a pistol that he concealed in a loaf of bread.

Harel's powerful position stood in contrast to his personal life. His neighbors took him for a minor government official. Harel and his wife Rivka had one daughter, named Miriam, two grandsons and one granddaughter.

Intelligence career
After the creation of Israel in 1948, Harel founded and became the first director of Israel's internal security agency, Shin Bet. Later, he took over the Mossad a year after it was created in 1951. As chief of two of the nation's three intelligence agencies, Harel wielded considerable power in Israel's first 15 years.

In 1957, members of the West German government provided Israel with information that Adolf Eichmann was hiding in Argentina under the name "Ricardo Klement". Eichmann, as director of Department IV-B4 of Nazi Germany's Reich Security Main Office (RSHA) during the Second World War, had played a crucial role in the planning and execution of the so-called "Final Solution to the Jewish Question". Israeli prime minister David Ben-Gurion believed that seeking Eichmann's extradition from Argentina by legal and diplomatic methods would be unsuccessful. In 1959, he placed Harel in charge of the operation to locate, seize, and secretly extract Eichmann from Argentina, with the intention of returning him to Israel to stand trial. In April 1960, Harel's team of agents arrived in Buenos Aires, and tracked Eichmann to a residence in the San Fernando neighborhood of the city. Harel followed soon after. On May 11, they kidnapped Eichmann as he walked from a bus stop to his home. Days later, Eichmann was drugged and clandestinely placed on an Israeli diplomatic aircraft, disguised as a crew member. He was flown to Tel Aviv. According to Harel himself, when he arrived back in Israel with the captured Eichmann, Harel went to Ben-Gurion's office and told the prime minister: "I've brought you a present. Eichmann is here."

Harel later stated that it was his belief that if the Eichmann operation had begun some weeks earlier, the Mossad may have had a chance to apprehend Dr. Josef Mengele, the notorious physician who presided over the selections on the train platform at Auschwitz. His book about the operation, The House on Garibaldi Street, became a best-seller and a 1979 television film (The House on Garibaldi Street).

Harel was also responsible for the intelligence coup that cemented the Mossad's reputation with Western intelligence agencies. In March 1956, three years after the death of Soviet dictator Joseph Stalin, his successor Nikita Khrushchev denounced Stalin's "cult of personality" and brutal paranoia in a speech before a closed session of the Communist Party's 20th Congress. Word spread of this event, but U.S. intelligence agencies were unable to obtain the text of the so-called "Secret Speech". The Soviet politburo delivered copies of the speech to a few Eastern-bloc countries; in Poland, a journalist named Viktor Grayevsky borrowed a copy from his girlfriend, who worked in the office of the First Secretary of the Polish Communist Party. Grayevsky, who was Jewish, had recently visited Israel and had decided to emigrate; he gave the speech to security officers at the Israeli embassy in Warsaw, and they in turn sent photographed copies to Harel in Tel Aviv. Harel shared the speech with his counterparts in other Western intelligence offices, most notably counterintelligence spymaster James Jesus Angleton of the American CIA.

Harel was forced to resign from Mossad in March 1963, while conducting Operation Damocles, a covert operation to dissuade German rocket scientists from working for Egyptian President Gamal Abdel Nasser's heavy rocket program. The Mossad's tactics included sending mail bombs and arranging assassination attempts. Harel resigned in March 1963 after these tactics injured several people other than the scientists and seemed to be ineffective in preventing their cooperation with the Egyptians.

Political career
After leaving Mossad, Harel turned to politics. He joined David Ben-Gurion's newly created National List prior to the 1969 elections, and was elected to the Knesset as the party won four seats. However, after Ben-Gurion resigned from the party it began to disintegrate, with two of the MKs defecting to Likud and the other to the Alignment. As a result, Harel lost his seat in the 1973 elections.

Published works
 The Great Deceit: a Political Novel (1971) 
 Jihad (1972) 
 The House on Garibaldi Street (1975) 
 The Anatomy of Treason (1980) 
 Operation Yossele (1982) 
 The Crisis of the German Scientists (1982) 
 Brother Against Brother: the Authorized Comprehensive Analyses of the Lavon Affair (1982) 
 The Truth About the Kastner Murder (1985) 
 Soviet Espionage (1987) 
 Security and Democracy (1989)

References

External links

 

1912 births
2003 deaths
Belarusian Jews
Directors of the Mossad
Directors of the Shin Bet
Israeli people of Belarusian-Jewish descent
Members of the 7th Knesset (1969–1974)
Movement for Greater Israel politicians
National List politicians
Soviet emigrants to Mandatory Palestine
Burials at Yarkon Cemetery
Adolf Eichmann